Brian Humphries is a businessman who is currently the Special Advisor of Cognizant.

Education
Brian Humphries was born in the County Wicklow, Ireland. He received his Bachelors of Business Administration with Honors, from the University of Ulster in 1996.

Career 
He began his career with Compaq and Digital Equipment Corporation. He served as various posts in Hewlett-Packard from August 2003 to 2013. He joined Hewlett-Packard in August 2003 as Director of Financial Communications and raised to Vice President of Growth Markets Organization/Emerging Markets. He also served as the President of Enterprise Solutions at Dell EMC from 2013 to 2017. Brian joined Vodafone in December 2016 and served as CEO of Vodafone Business from February 1, 2017 to December 2018.

He took over as the CEO of Cognizant in April 2019. Under his leadership, Cognizant witnessed severe voluntary attrition rates of 33 percent and non-voluntary attrition of 37 percent, as almost one third of employees quit in a quarter as per recent reports.

In August 2022, Cognizant replaced Humphries with Ravi Kumar S. as the CEO of Cognizant.

References

Living people
Year of birth missing (living people)
21st-century Irish businesspeople
21st-century Irish people
American technology chief executives
Alumni of Ulster University
Hewlett-Packard people
Irish chief executives
People from County Wicklow
Vodafone people